An animal is a multicellular, eukaryotic organism of the kingdom Animalia or Metazoa.

Animal, Animals, or The Animal may also refer to:

People
 The Animal (nickname), a list of people nicknamed "The Animal" or "Animal"
 Animal Hamaguchi, a ring name of Japanese retired professional wrestler Heigo Hamaguchi (born 1947)
 Road Warrior Animal or Animal, ring names of American professional wrestler Joseph Michael Laurinaitis (1960–2020)

Books and publications
 Animal (book), full title Animal: The Definitive Visual Guide to The World's WildLife
 Animal, 2012 novel by K'wan Foye
 Animal (journal), full title: Animal: An International Journal of Animal Bioscience
Animals (novel), a 2014 novel by Emma Jane Unsworth

Film and television

Films
 Animal (1977 film), a French film (L'Animal) starring Jean-Paul Belmondo and Raquel Welch
 Animals (1998 film), an American film starring Tim Roth and Rod Steiger
 Animal (2001 film), an Argentine comedy film by Sergio Bizzio with Carlos Roffé
 Animal (2005 film), an American direct-to-video action drama film starring Ving Rhames and Terrance Howard
 Animal (2014 film), an American horror film starring Keke Palmer
 Animal (2018 film), an Argentine film
 Animals (2003 film), a stand-up show written and performed by Ricky Gervais
 Animals (2012 film), a Spanish film
 Animals (2014 film), a British drama film written by and starring David Dastmalchian
 Animals (2017 film), a German film
 Animals (2019 film), an Australian film
 Animals (2021 film), a psychological thriller film
 The Animal, a 2001 American comedy film featuring Rob Schneider
 The Animals (film), a 2012 Filipino coming-of-age film by Gino M. Santos

Television
 Animal (TV series), an American nature documentary series
 Animals (American TV series), a 2016–2018 animated series
 Animals (South Korean TV series), a 2015 reality-variety show
 "Animals" (The Goodies), a 1980 episode
 "Animals" (Men Behaving Badly), a 1992 episode
 "Animals" (Off the Air), a 2011 episode
 "Animals" (The Vicar of Dibley), a 1994 episode
 "The Animals" (Orange Is the New Black), a 2016 episode
 Animal (audio drama), a 2011 audio drama based on Doctor Who

Characters
 Animal (Muppet), a character from the television series The Muppet Show
 Animal, a character in the television series Takeshi's Castle
 Animal, played by Ken Hudson Campbell, a character on the TV sitcom Herman's Head
 Dennis "Animal" Price, a character on the TV series Lou Grant

Music
 The Animals, a British rock band
 A.N.I.M.A.L., an Argentine heavy metal band
 Animal (Nick Culmer) lead singer of the Anti-Nowhere League

Albums
 Animal (Animosity album), 2007
 Animal (Bar-Kays album), 1989
 Animal (Big Scary album), 2016
 Animal (Kesha album), 2010
 Animal (Lump album), 2021
 Animal (María Becerra album), 2021
 Animal (Motor Ace album), 2005
 Animals (Pink Floyd album), 1977
 Animals (This Town Needs Guns album), 2008
 The Animals (American album), by the Animals, 1964
 The Animals (British album), by the Animals, 1964
 Animal, a 2009 album by AutoKratz
 Animal, a 2013 album by Berlin
 Animal, a 2008 album by Far East Movement
 Animal!, a 2008 album by Margot & the Nuclear So and So's

EPs
 Animals (EP) by Ryan Starx, 2013
 Animal, a 2015 EP by Hidden in Plain View
 A.N.I.M.A.L, a 2019 EP by John Newman

Songs

"Animal"
"Animal" (Álvaro Soler song), 2017
"Animal" (Conor Maynard song), 2013
"Animal" (Def Leppard song), 1987
"Animal" (Jebediah song), 1999
"Animal" (Juvenile song), 2006
"Animal" (María Becerra and Cazzu song), 2022
"Animal" (Miike Snow song), 2009
"Animal" (Neon Trees song), 2010
"Animal" (Pearl Jam song), 1994
"Animal" (R.E.M. song), 2004
"Animal" (R.I.O. song), 2011
"Animal" (Trey Songz song), 2017
"Animal" (Troye Sivan song), 2018
"Animal", by Against Me! from New Wave
"Animal", by Ani DiFranco from Educated Guess
"Animal", by Anti-Nowhere League from We Are...The League, 1982
"Animal", by Aurora from A Different Kind of Human (Step 2)
"Animal", by Black Light Burns from Cruel Melody
"Animal", by Ellie Goulding from Lights
"Animal", by Karen O and the Kids from Where the Wild Things Are
"Animal", by Kat DeLuna from 9 Lives
"Animal", by Kesha from Animal
"Animal", by the Men from Open Your Heart, 2012
"Animal", by Mindless Self Indulgence from If
"Animal", by Mudmen from Overrated
"Animal", by Nada Surf from You Know Who You Are, 2016
"Animal", by Subhumans from Demolition War
"Animal", by Sunhouse from Crazy On The Weekend
"Animal", by The Kinks from To the Bone
"Animal", by Toto from Past to Present 1977–1990
"Animal (F**k Like a Beast)", by W.A.S.P., 1984

"Animals"
"Animals" (Architects song), 2020
"Animals" (Kevin Ayers song), 1980
"Animals" (Maroon 5 song), 2014
"Animals" (Martin Garrix song), 2013
"Animals" (Muse song), 2012
 "Animals" (Nickelback song), 2005
 "Animals", by CocoRosie from The Adventures of Ghosthorse and Stillborn
"Animals", by Coldplay as one of the B-sides for "Clocks"
"Animals", by Dead Poetic from Vices
"Animals", by Talking Heads from Fear of Music
"Animals", by The End from Elementary
"Animals", by Todrick Hall featuring Matt Bloyd from Forbidden

"The Animal"
"The Animal" (Disturbed song), 2010
"The Animal", by Steve Vai from Passion and Warfare

Other uses
 ANIMAL (computer worm), an early self-replicating computer program
 ANIMAL (image processing), an interactive software environment for image processing
 Operation Animals, a World War II Allied deception operation in Greece
 Animals (Israeli organization),  an animal rights group based in Israel

See also
 Animals, Animals, Animals, an American educational television series (1976–1981)